Leela Omchery is a classical singer, musicologist and writer. She is known for her contributions to classical music and is a recipient of Padmashri award from Government of India for her contributions to Indian classical dance and music.

Life 
Leela Omchery was born in 1928 in Mankoyikkal tharavdu in Thiruvattar in Kanyakumari district in Tamil Nadu. Her parents were Parameswara Kurup and Lakshmikutty Amma. She started learning music from an early age under Karnatic music guru, Thiruvattar Arumugham Pillai Bhagavathar, along with her younger brother, late Kamukara Purushothaman, a classical and playback singer in Malayalam. Hailing from a family of musicians, she had the opportunity to hone her music talents under the guidance of her grand mother and mother who were musicians in their own rights.

After early schooling in Kanyakumari, she obtained graduate degree in Carnatic music from Women's college, Thiruvananthapuram and continued her studies in Hindustani music at Punjab University and obtained another graduate degree. Her Master's degree came from Meerut University and she got her PhD in music from Delhi University.

She is married to writer Omchery N. N. Pillai and resides in New Delhi. The couple has two children, S.D. Omchery and Deepti Omchery Bhalla, a classical dancer.

She has also written some short stories.

Career
Leela Omchery is presently working as a Professor in Kamukara School of Music, Dance and Research Studies, Thiruvananthapuram, Kerala and as Professor and Principal of Trikalaa Gurukulam in Delhi.

She is the President of Dakshina Bharati (a south Indian Women’s Organization) and Vice President of Swaralaya, Delhi.

She is an accredited Supervisor and Guide to Ph.D and M.Phil from various universities including Delhi, Kerala, Calicut, Baroda, Nalanda, and Bombay. She is also a member of the Selection Board of AIR, Doordarshan, ICCR, IGNCA, SNA (Delhi), Ministry of Culture and IGNOU.

She has also worked as the Associate Professor and Head, Karnatak Music Section, Faculty of Music & Fine Arts, University of Delhi (1964–1994). She also served as Editorial Staff of Indian Music Journal, Vageeshwari, (1975–1994).

Works

English

Malayalam

On Other Topics
 Leelanjali (Short stories)
 Jeevitham (Drama)
 Parthivan Kanavu – Translation from Tamil 
 Katha Bharathi – Translation from Tamil 
 Aaharavum Aarogyavum

She is also credited with over 200 published articles.

Awards and recognitions

 Padmashri by Government of India in 2009
 Kendra Sangeet Natak Academy Award for the contribution to Traditional Music (Sopaana Sangeetham) and popular music of Kerala in 2003
 Marunaadan Malayaali Award for Excellence in the field of Traditional music and Arts, Delhi in 2008
 Kerala Sangeetha Nataka Akademi Fellowship in 1990
 Sangeeta Kulapathi from Kalaadarppanam, Kerala in 2003
 Sangeet Kovida from Gayatri Fine Arts, Delhi in 2003
 Kalaacharya from Akhila Kerala Maaraar Mahaa Sabha, Kerala in 1990
 Sangeeta Sarva Bhouma from Astika Samaj, Delhi in 2006
 Award for overall contributions to Music and Culture, Panchavaadya Trust, Delhi in 2006
 Senior Fellowships/Associate ship for Research Projects from various prestigious national organizations like Indian Council of Historical Research (ICHR), University Grants Commission (UGC), Indira Gandhi National Centre for Arts and Culture (IGNCA), SNA (Delhi).

References

Further reading

External links
 Facebook

Malayali people
1929 births
Recipients of the Padma Shri in arts
Living people
Indian women musicologists
Indian musicologists
20th-century Indian non-fiction writers
Indian women classical musicians
Recipients of the Sangeet Natak Akademi Award
20th-century Indian educators
Singers from Tamil Nadu
People from Kanyakumari district
Educators from Tamil Nadu
Women writers from Tamil Nadu
Women musicians from Tamil Nadu
20th-century Indian women singers
20th-century Indian singers
21st-century Indian women singers
21st-century Indian singers
Women educators from Tamil Nadu
20th-century women writers
20th-century women educators
Recipients of the Kerala Sangeetha Nataka Akademi Fellowship